Mereworth Sound is a sound on the Central Coast of British Columbia, Canada, located to the north of Belize Inlet.

See also
Mereworth

References

Central Coast of British Columbia
Sounds of British Columbia